Karl Ruprect Kroenen is a fictional supervillain in the Hellboy comic book series, created by Mike Mignola.

In the comics, Kroenen was a relatively unremarkable Nazi SS scientist, whose most distinguishing characteristic was that he always wore a gas mask and protective bodysuit, which Mignola attributes to a disfiguring accident of some kind.

Director Guillermo del Toro created a significantly expanded biography for the character, to appear as a supervillain in the 2004 film adaptation.

History

Comics history
A German scientist working for the Nazis, and a member of the Thule Society, Dr. Kroenen became one of the top scientists for Project Ragna Rok, and a close disciple of Grigori Rasputin, along with Ilsa Haupstein and Leopold Kurtz. He was present with Rasputin at the secret ritual in Scotland that brought Hellboy to the world.

Kroenen, Haupstein, and Kurtz were frozen inside a secret Nazi base, until they were resuscitated by industrialist Roderick Zinco, acting on Rasputin's orders. Kroenen resumed work on several of his former projects, including making an "Apocalypse Army" by combining corpses with robotics. He also convinced Zinco to retrieve the head of his colleague, Herman von Klempt, from South America. Kroenen retained an affection for his colleague, though Rasputin had rejected Klempt as unsuitable for Ragna Rok. When Klempt's head was re-animated, he tried to convince Kroenen to abandon Rasputin's plan to awaken the Ogdru Jahad - and instead to use the Army to retrieve Klempt's work in South America. Overhearing, Kurtz became furious and attacked Klempt's head, screaming, "Rasputin is master!" In a panic, Kroenen seized a knife and killed Kurtz. When their plan failed, an enraged Rasputin struck Zinco, who was blinded. Wandering around, Zinco accidentally pressed a self-destruct button in the base, destroying it completely.

Despite appearances, Kroenen survived and resurfaced years later with Leopold Kurtz to assist Isiah Marsten in acquiring a vessel from the B.P.R.D. Kroenen assumed the body was intended for Rapustin before learning that Marsten tricked him into resurrecting the Black Flame, escaping the resulting chaos with von Klempt's head. Kroenen was found sometime later by Varvara, who reawakened von Klempt and invited the two men to join her cause in rebuilding Pandemonium on Earth. Kroenen became increasingly skeptical of Varvara, who eventually incinerated him.

2004 film biography

In the first film adaptation of Hellboy, director Guillermo del Toro created a significantly expanded biography for Kronen that is mentioned in a series of comic panels in the book Hellboy: The Art of the Movie and the special features of the film's DVD.

Born in 1897 Munich, Karl Ruprecht Kroenen was an opera prodigy with angelic features and blonde hair who toured the capitals of Europe until his career ended once his voice deepened with the onset of puberty. Kroenen demonstrated symptoms of masochism at a very early age, which combined with his perfectionism into an extreme form of "surgical addiction" out of self-loathing in his teenage years that led to him conducting brutal experiments on himself: Surgically removing his own eyelids, lips, and his toe- and finger nails. He also designed a tight-fitting gas mask to filter out germs, which he wore almost permanently. He also became quite adept with mechanical devices, believing that fusing mechanical constructs with living bodies would help create perfection. One of his early inventions was a clockwork nightingale that sang a Mozart aria perfectly. A masterful fencer, he also became renowned for his swordsmanship and created his own signature swords.

In 1930, he met the resurrected Rasputin and quickly became his most loyal disciple. He subsequently joined the Nazi Party, and rose quickly through the ranks, joining the Schutzstaffel (SS) in 1933 and achieving the rank of Obersturmbannführer (lieutenant colonel). He was awarded the Iron Cross for services to the Third Reich, including a tour of duty as commandant of Auschwitz concentration camp, where he served with distinction.  Kroenen became head of the Thule Society, a group of German aristocrats obsessed with the occult. He helped them to spearhead Project Ragna Rok, engineering the portal generator that would conjure the Scarlet Beast, Hellboy, in October 1944.

When Allied Forces stormed the island off the coast of Scotland where Project Ragna Rok took place, Kroenen killed several of the American soldiers attacking the base, but was distracted by a grenade thrown under the portal device by a young Professor Trevor Bruttenholm. Kroenen tried to retrieve the grenade, but his left hand was blown off, and a length of concrete reinforcing rod (or rebar) impaled him through the chest, severing his spine. Shortly thereafter, he disappeared. After his disappearance, in 1956, an unmarked grave in Romania was found. Dental records identified the remains as those of Kroenen.

However, Kroenen reappeared in 2004. Thanks to the inexplicable powers of science and black magic, Kroenen "repaired" himself with a prosthetic mechanical hand, a steel rod replacing the broken part of his spine and a clockwork heart, operated by a wind-up key implanted in his chest. By cranking the key, he was able to increase his speed and reflexes. After long decades, the blood in his veins dried up completely, leaving only dust, and rendering him virtually invulnerable to gunshot wounds. He could also turn the key to "switch off" his body (literally), remaining in a dormant state and appearing dead, until he was reanimated. He used this deceptive technique to infiltrate the BPRD headquarters. After critically wounding BPRD Agent Clay, he faked his own death and lay beside Clay, and they were both taken into the headquarters. Once inside, Kroenen drew Rasputin there, and personally killed the now elderly Professor Bruttenholm, before disappearing with Rasputin.

The BPRD tracked Rasputin to his own mausoleum beneath Moscow. Hellboy seemingly avenged Bruttenholm's death by throwing Kroenen into an impalement trap — a spiked pit hidden beneath a trapdoor. Skewered on the stakes, Kroenen was crushed when Hellboy dropped a giant cog on top of him. This is unknown if Kroenen survived this or not.

Kroenen's smashed gas mask later appeared in a display case at the BPRD in Hellboy II: The Golden Army. In the script for that film, an epilogue scene was written to be a lead-in for a third movie, but was cut for budgetary reasons. An animated version of the scene appears on the DVD's special features. Found by Roderick Zinco in the mausoleum ruins, Kroenen's remains are brought to a doctor to be revived with advanced alchemy, before traveling to the Arctic into a long abandoned Nazi weapon storage building to insert the disembodied head of Kroenen into a huge robotic body at which point Kroenen awakes and praises his "Master" foreseeing his resurrection as Rasputin appears on screen.

In the commentary of Golden Army, Guillermo del Toro also stated that, in the planned story for the third film, Kroenen was to have some history with the character of Johann Krauss. This was hinted in the second film when Johann is seen staring in deep thought at Kroenen's mask in the display case during the part when Hellboy is in the ward.

Weapons and equipment
Kroenen's comics version is a fairly ordinary scientist, who seems to possess some surgical training.

In the 2004 film and the 2019 film's flashback, the former having him wear an SS uniform with a pair of Katar (कटार)-like daggers concealed in the sleeves, Kroenen wields a Luger P08 pistol. In his later appearances in the 2004 film, he wields a pair of tonfa-style swords along with several other daggers strapped to his suit.

Portrayals

Hellboy (2004)
Czech actor Ladislav Beran portrayed Kroenen in the 2004 film adaptation of Hellboy.

This portrayal is radically different from the comics. Kroenen, who originally played the part of a meek character, who Del Toro describes as someone who is likely to say "Aargh! Don't break the machine!" is here portrayed as a murderous soldier who is inhumanly loyal to Rasputin. The spelling of his middle name was also changed from "Ruprect" to "Ruprecht".

Hellboy (2019)
Kroenen also appears in the 2019 film reboot, portrayed by Ilko Iliev. He is the one member of Project Ragnarok to escape alive.

Critical response
German film historian Florian Evers devotes a whole chapter of his book on National Socialism in modern pop culture to the character of Karl Ruprecht Kroenen. He points out the allegoric puzzle segments of Shoah-iconography behind the design of Kroenen, calling him an incarnation of the Holocaust.

References

Characters created by Mike Mignola
Comics characters introduced in 1994
Comics characters who can move at superhuman speeds
Dark Horse Comics film characters
Fictional amputees
Fictional assassins in comics
Fictional cyborgs
Fictional German people
Fictional henchmen
Fictional mass murderers
Fictional physicians
Fictional scientists in comics
Fictional singers
Fictional undead
Hellboy characters
Fictional Nazis in comics

ru:Список персонажей комиксов о Хеллбое#Карл Рупрехт Кронен